The Technical College Balapitiya is situated in Balapitiya, Galle District, Sri Lanka.  Established in 1982, the college is managed by the Department of Technical Education and Training.

Expansion
Hilfswerk Austria, in 2007, donated a fully equipped building, to the college, that included two libraries and a computer laboratory. The cost was Rs. 20 million. A solar powered Electrical and Computer Laboratory was opened on 29 July 2011. It had been designed and project managed as part of the Korea International Cooperation Agency programme.

References

Balapitiya
Balapitiya
Educational institutions established in 1982
Education in Galle District
Universities and colleges in Southern Province, Sri Lanka
1982 establishments in Sri Lanka